David Shlomo Rosen KSG CBE (born 1951) is the former Chief Rabbi of Ireland (1979–1985) and currently serves as the American Jewish Committee's International Director of Interreligious Affairs. From 2005 until 2009 he headed the International Jewish Committee for Inter-religious Consultations (IJCIC), the broad-based coalition of Jewish organizations and denominations that represents World Jewry in its relations with other world religions.

Before being appointed Chief Rabbi of Ireland, he was the senior rabbi of the largest Orthodox Jewish congregation in South Africa (the Green and Sea Point Hebrew Congregation, Cape Town) and served as a judge on the Cape Beth Din (rabbinic court). He is also a board member of the Brussels-based organization CEJI - A Jewish Contribution to an Inclusive Europe that promotes a Europe of diversity and respect.

He is an alumnus of Yeshivat Har Etzion in Israel.

Interfaith relations
Based in Jerusalem, he also serves on the Chief Rabbinate of Israel's Commission for Interreligious Relations.

He is an international president of Religions for Peace; and serves as the only Jewish representative on the board of directors of the KAICIID Dialogue Centre (interfaith centre) established in 2012 by King Abdullah of Saudi Arabia together with the governments of Austria and Spain and the Vatican. He is honorary president of the International Council of Christians and Jews; and serves on the board of World Religious Leaders for the Elijah Interfaith Institute; and the World Council of Religious Leaders.

Awards
In November 2005, Rosen was made a Knight Commander of the Order of St. Gregory the Great in recognition of his contribution to Jewish-Catholic reconciliation, making him the first Israeli citizen and the first Orthodox rabbi to receive this honour. In the same year he also won the Mount Zion Award for Interreligious Understanding. In December 2006, he received the Raphael Lemkin Human Rights Award from Rabbis for Human Rights – North America for having founded the organization Rabbis for Human Rights. Rosen was appointed Commander of the Order of the British Empire (CBE) in the 2010 New Year Honours by Queen Elizabeth II.

In 2016, he was awarded the Hubert Walter Award for Reconciliation and Interfaith Cooperation by the Archbishop of Canterbury "for his commitment and contribution to the work of Inter Religious relations between, particularly, the Jewish and Catholic faiths".

Personal life
He is married to Sharon (née Rothstein), who co-directs the Jerusalem office of Search for Common Ground. They have three daughters and six grandchildren. Born in Newbury, Berkshire, he is the third son of Rabbi Kopul Rosen and the brother of Rabbis Jeremy Rosen (b. 1942) and Michael Rosen (21 January 1945 – 8 December 2008).

Vegetarianism
Rosen is the honorary president of the International Jewish Vegetarian and Ecology Society. He is a vigorous critic of factory farming, noting that "much of the current treatment of animals in the livestock trade makes the consumption of meat produced through such cruel conditions halachically unacceptable as the product of illegitimate means." In addition, he has argued that the waste of natural resources and the damage done to the environment by "meat production" make a compelling Jewish moral argument for adopting a vegan diet. He has written extensively on a wide variety of interfaith issues.

See also
 History of the Jews in Ireland
 Jewish vegetarianism

References

External links

 Official website

Chief rabbis of Ireland
Living people
British Orthodox rabbis
Irish Orthodox rabbis
Israeli Modern Orthodox rabbis
Yeshivat Har Etzion
South African Orthodox rabbis
1951 births
20th-century rabbis
21st-century rabbis
Commanders of the Order of the British Empire
Vegetarianism activists
Jewish vegetarianism